Juan Pérez-Caballero y Ferrer (8 November 1861, in Madrid – 1951, in San Sebastián) was a Spanish politician and diplomat who served three times as Minister of State during the reign of Alfonso XIII.

|-

|-

|-

Foreign ministers of Spain
1861 births
1951 deaths
Liberal Party (Spain, 1880) politicians